Karlo Kreković (born 27 January 1999) is a Croatian water polo player. He is currently playing for VK Solaris. He is 6 ft 4 in (1.94 m) tall and weighs 212 lb (96 kg). His father Joško Kreković is a head coach of his son's water polo team.

References

External links
Splitski vaterpolisti zalog sjajne budućnosti

1999 births
Living people
Croatian male water polo players
European Games competitors for Croatia
Water polo players at the 2015 European Games
Water polo players from Split, Croatia